Nancy Wilson may refer to:
 Nancy Wilson (jazz singer) (1937–2018), American jazz singer and actress
 Nancy Wilson (religious leader) (born 1950), Moderator of the Metropolitan Community Churches
 Nancy Wilson (rock musician) (born 1954), American rock singer and guitarist for the band Heart
 Nancy Wilson (journalist) (born 1955), Canadian television journalist
 Nancy Wilson (basketball) (born 1969), professional and college basketball coach